Arsen Melikyan (born May 17, 1976) is an Armenian weightlifter.

Melikyan won an Olympic bronze medal at the 2000 Summer Olympics by snatching 365 kg. He became the first Olympian from the independent Republic of Armenia to win an Olympic bronze medal for weightlifting, a first for the country. Melikyan later won a bronze medal at the 2005 European Weightlifting Championships.

References

External links
 
 Arsen Melikyan at Lift Up

1976 births
Living people
Sportspeople from Yerevan
Armenian male weightlifters
Olympic weightlifters of Armenia
Weightlifters at the 2000 Summer Olympics
Olympic bronze medalists for Armenia
Olympic medalists in weightlifting
Medalists at the 2000 Summer Olympics
European Weightlifting Championships medalists
20th-century Armenian people
21st-century Armenian people